Hobbs Glacier is a glacier situated in a steep, rock-walled cirque at the northwest side of Hamilton Point, and flowing southeast into the southern part of Markham Bay on the east coast of James Ross Island, Antarctica. It was first seen and surveyed by the Swedish Antarctic Expedition, 1901–04, under Otto Nordenskiöld, who named it for Professor William H. Hobbs, an American geologist and glaciologist.

See also
 List of glaciers in the Antarctic
 Glaciology

References

Glaciers of James Ross Island